Marvin Mehlem (born 11 September 1997) is a German professional footballer who plays as a midfielder for SV Darmstadt 98.

International career
Mehlem is a youth international for Germany at the U16, 17, 18, and 19 levels.

Career statistics

References

External links
 

1997 births
Living people
Footballers from Karlsruhe
Association football midfielders
German footballers
Germany youth international footballers
Karlsruher SC players
SV Darmstadt 98 players
2. Bundesliga players